Cuckoo Song is a medieval English round or rota of the mid-13th century.

Cuckoo Song may also refer to 
 "Dance of the Cuckoos", also known as the Cuckoo Song, the theme music for Laurel and Hardy
 Cuckoo Song (novel)
 "Cuckoo Song" (instrumental)

See also 
 Cuckoo (disambiguation)#Music